Evie is a feminine given name, diminutive of Eve and Evelyn; often a short form (hypocorism) of another, such as Evangeline, Evangelina, Evita or even the French Geneviève. 

Evie may refer to:

People:
 Evie Christie (born 1979), Canadian poet and author
 Evie Dominikovic (born 1980), an Australian tennis player
 Edith Elizabeth Evie Greene (1875–1917), English actress and singer
 Vina Evie Hayes (1912–1988), American-born actor and singer who achieved stage success in Australia
 Eva Evie Hone (1894–1955), Irish painter and stained glass artist
 Evanne Evie Hudak (born 1951), American politician
 Evie Irie (born 1998), Australian pop singer
 Evie Millynn (born 1994), New Zealand footballer
 Evie Peck, American actress and producer
 Evie Richards (born 1997), British cyclist
 Evelyn Tornquist (born 1957) or Evie (singer), American contemporary Christian music singer
 Evelyn Evie Wyld (born 1980), Anglo-Australian author
 Evie Tamala (born 1969), Indonesian pop and dangdut singer
 Evie Nicholson (born 2007)

Fictional characters:
 Evie Carnahan, the female lead in 1999 movie The Mummy
 Evie Frye, a British assassin and one of the protagonists of Assassin's Creed: Syndicate
 Evie Prior, a character in Waterloo Road
 Evie, the protagonist of the Paranormalcy novel series
 Evie, from the 2016 show No Tomorrow
 Evie (Descendants), daughter of the Evil Queen in the 2015 film Descendants
 Evie the Mist Fairy, a character from the Rainbow Magic book franchise
 Evie McLaren, a character in Mako: Island of Secrets 

Feminine given names
Hypocorisms